San Vincenzo is an Italian commune in the province of Livorno, region of Tuscany, located about  southwest of Florence and about  southeast of Livorno.

Walter Mazzarri, former manager of Watford F.C. was born in San Vincenzo in 1961.

Twin towns
 Guanabo, Cuba
 Pfarrkirchen, Germany
 Saint-Maximin-la-Sainte-Baume, France

References

External links

Official website
Beach Tennis Sports Association

Cities and towns in Tuscany